Opera, or the Undoing of Women (French: L’Opéra ou la Défaite des femmes) is a 1979 book by French philosopher Catherine Clément, in which the author explores the way in which traditional operatic plots often feature the death of female characters - in her words, "the infinitely repetitive spectacle of a woman who dies, murdered." Besides the literal deaths of characters such as Carmen, Cio-Cio-San, Isolde and Mélisande, Clément also discusses metaphorical deaths - for example, Turandot's power and the Marschallin's sexuality. Clément makes many references to works outside the field of traditional musicological and opera scholarship, including Jules Michelet's La Sorcière and Claude Lévi-Strauss's Mythologiques.

The English translation, published 1988, is by Betsy Wing, with a foreword by Susan McClary.

Operas discussed

Aida
La Bohème
Carmen
Les Contes d'Hoffmann
Don Carlos
Don Giovanni
Elektra
Eugene Onegin
Falstaff
Lucia di Lammermoor
Madama Butterfly
Die Meistersinger von Nürnberg
Norma
Otello
Parsifal
Pelléas et Mélisande
I Puritani
Der Ring des Nibelungen
Der Rosenkavalier
La Sonnambula
Tosca
La Traviata
Tristan und Isolde
Turandot
Die Zauberflöte

Reception

Some critics, including musicologist Carolyn Abbate, criticized Clément's failure to discuss the music of opera in her focus on the libretto. These critics argue that although female characters die, they also hold the "authorial voice" and thus, through singing, reverse the tradition of the passive, silent woman as object.

References

1979 non-fiction books
Books about opera
Feminist books
Literature by women